Stephen Richards "Steve" Towle (born October 23, 1953 in Kansas City, Kansas) is a former American football linebacker in the National Football League. He was drafted by the Miami Dolphins in the 6th round of the 1975 NFL Draft. He played college football at Kansas.

Professional career
Towle was drafted by the Miami Dolphins in the 6th round of the 1975 NFL Draft. He holds the Dolphins record for a tackles in a season with 217 in 1976 and was the team's MVP during that season.

References

1953 births
Living people
Sportspeople from Kansas City, Kansas
Players of American football from Kansas
American football linebackers
Kansas Jayhawks football players
Miami Dolphins players